JFK and the Unspeakable: Why He Died and Why It Matters is a book by theologian and Catholic Worker James W. Douglass (Orbis Books, 2008; Touchstone Books, an imprint of Simon & Schuster, 2010) that analyzes the presidency of John F. Kennedy as well as the events surrounding his assassination. The book is drawn from many sources, including the Warren Report. The book's central thesis is that Kennedy was a cold warrior who turned to peace-making, and that as a result he was killed by his own security apparatus.

Published by the Maryknoll Fathers and Brothers, it received an award from the Catholic Press Association and coverage in the religious press; sales shot up after Oliver Stone recommended the book, with it featuring in Amazon.com's Top 100 for a week. The 2013 edition of the book was endorsed by Kennedy's nephew Robert F. Kennedy Jr., who said it had moved him to visit Dealey Plaza for the first time.

Background
The book took Douglass twelve years to write. The book was rejected by Orbis three times before it was accepted. Publisher Robert Ellsberg said that besides the book's 500-page length, it fell outside the usual range of topics published by Orbis, and that he was reluctant to enter the "dark thicket" of Kennedy conspiracy theories. However, according to National Catholic Reporter, "after sending the book to a wide range of historians and analysts, Mr. Ellsberg was persuaded of the book's significance."

Contents
The title is a reference to Thomas Merton's Raids on the Unspeakable, regarding (according to Douglass) "a kind of systemic evil that includes such realities as the Holocaust, the Vietnam War, the nuclear arms race, and these assassinations", which Merton calls a "void". In Merton's words, the void "gets into the language of public and official declarations ... and makes them ring dead with the hollowness of the abyss. It is the void out of which Eichmann drew the punctilious exactitude of his obedience." Douglass links this description with the height of the Cuban Missile Crisis, seeing both Kennedy and Khrushchev "encounter[ing] that void simultaneously". Douglass describes (citing Khrushchev's memoirs) Kennedy deciding to reach out to Khrushchev via his brother Robert F. Kennedy to declare that he is losing power to his generals, who favour nuclear war, and that he needs Khrushchev's help to avoid it. Douglass concludes that Kennedy "turned from global war to a strategy of peace. That's the why of his assassination." Douglass avoids much of the practical detail of the "how"; the single bullet theory is not mentioned, and the book includes no photographs or maps. Instead, Douglass follows the intelligence links around Kennedy, Lee Harvey Oswald, and key people involved in the post-assassination investigation.

The book highlights the Bay of Pigs Invasion as the Central Intelligence Agency's attempt to entrap Kennedy into a full-scale US invasion of Cuba. Citing Daniel Schorr's conclusion that "In effect, President Kennedy was the target of a CIA covert operation that collapsed when the invasion collapsed", the book argues that the result of this operation was Kennedy's avowed intention "to splinter the CIA in a thousand pieces and scatter it to the winds." The forced resignation of CIA Director Allen Dulles and several deputies served notice that this statement might be followed through. The book describes Kennedy's conflict with the military, including over the Cuban Missile Crisis (1962), the Partial Nuclear Test Ban Treaty (ratified by the Senate in September 1963), and a back-channel to Fidel Castro in September 1963, via William Attwood, aimed at normalising relations, and National Security Action Memorandum 263 (beginning withdrawal from Vietnam). The book also cites an April 1962 confrontation with the US steel industry, led by U.S. Steel, which together with five other steel companies declared a price increase shortly after an agreement had been brokered to avoid them, in order to control inflation. The Kennedy administration raided corporate offices, issued subpoenas, and tasked the Defense Department with overseas marketing of its steel. Shortly after the steel industry backed down, Henry Luce's Fortune published an editorial, headlined "Steel: The Ides of April", stating that the price rise had been conceived in political terms as a means to either damage the President's credibility, or to unite the business world against him.

Critical and commercial reception
Promotional reviews of the book were provided by Richard A. Falk, Gaeton Fonzi, and Robert F. Kennedy Jr. The book was well received by researchers into John F. Kennedy assassination conspiracy theories, with The Georgia Straight describing it in 2013 as "achiev[ing] a rare consensus inside the assassination research community for its wise and lucid organization of the known data.". Oliver Stone in 2009 described it as "an extraordinary new book [which] offers the best account I have read of this tragedy and its significance", and mentioned it during an appearance on Real Time with Bill Maher. In 2013, David Talbot included it in a list of the seven best books on the subject.

Ray McGovern described it in 2009 as "a very important book that was put out last year without much fanfare".

Ched Myers in Tikkun, in recommending the book to his readers, said the book "could not matter more." America called it "a compelling book, a thoroughly researched account of Kennedy’s turn toward peace, the consequent assassination and its aftermath". National Catholic Reporter wrote in 2008 "Should the book receive wider attention, its delineation of the conspiracy against Kennedy rather than his conversion to peacemaking will be the most controversial aspect since it concludes with a minute examination of old and new evidence that Kennedy was done in by his own security apparatus. ... The way Mr. Douglass' "how" stacks up with other theories that point toward the Mafia, the Russians, the Cubans or a combination of any or all of those is unclear. What is clear is that Mr. Douglass seems to have responsibly and painstakingly plumbed the evidence of the Kennedy assassination from a new angle and raised disturbing yet essential questions." Publishers Weekly said in 2012 the book was "now recommended reading for those seriously investigating political assassinations." The New York Observer said of the book that it included "a selective rehashing of such conspiracy chestnuts as the Ike Altgens photo, which allegedly shows Oswald standing in the doorway of the Texas Book Depository at the exact moment he should have been firing away on the sixth floor. The book’s real interest lies in its portrait of J.F.K. ...[and] does make a convincing case that J.F.K. was becoming deeply disillusioned with the bellicosity of American foreign policy and the inordinate power of the military–industrial complex. Whether this got him killed remains, like just about everything else that happened in Dallas, the stuff of myth."

John C. McAdams critically reviewed the book, declaring "As bad as Douglass's account of Kennedy’s foreign policy is, his depiction of a plot to murder JFK is worse—unspeakably bad, in fact. To paraphrase Thomas Merton, Douglass's muse and inspiration, the bunk and nonsense Douglass recycles goes beyond the capacity of words to describe. He is utterly uncritical of any theory, any witness, and any factoid, as long as it implies conspiracy."

A graphic novel version of the book reached its $17,500 funding target on kickstarter.com in October 2013. A play based on the book, called Noah's Ark, was staged in November 2013 in Birmingham, Alabama.

Editions
 JFK and the Unspeakable: Why He Died and Why It Matters, Orbis Books, 2008. . Hardback, 544pp
 JFK and the Unspeakable: Why He Died and Why It Matters, Touchstone Books, October 2010. . Paperback, 560pp

References

2008 non-fiction books
Non-fiction books about the assassination of John F. Kennedy